General elections were held in Thailand on 24 July 1988. The result was a victory for the Thai Nation Party, which won 87 of the 357 seats. Voter turnout was 63.6%.

Leaders of the top five elected political parties, consisting of the Thai Nation Party, the Social Action Party, the Democrat Party, the Ruam Thai Party and the Thai Citizen Party, discussed forming a government. All agreed that General Prem Tinsulanonda, the incumbent prime minister, should continue in office, and met with him his residence at Ban Si Sao Thewet on the evening of 27 July. However, Tinsulanonda refused to serve as prime minister for a fourth term, saying eight years and five months as Prime Minister was enough. Chatichai Choonhavan of the Thai Nation Party subsequently became Prime Minister on 4 August, appointing his cabinet on 9 August. Tinsulanonda was appointed as a Privy Councilor on 23 August.

Results

References

Thailand
1988 elections in Thailand
Elections in Thailand
Thailand